Bagga is a surname of Punjabi people found in Punjab (India) and Punjab (Pakistan).

Notable people with the surname include:

 Rajeev Bagga, Indian-born badminton player who represents Britain
 Sahir Ali Bagga, Pakistani singer, music director and composer
 Santokh Bagga, Canadian-Indian informant in the investigation of the 1985 Air India bombing
 Simran Bagga, known as Simran, Indian film actress, producer, classical dancer, model, and television personality
 S. K. Bagga, Indian politician in Delhi
 Surbhi Bagga, Indian podcaster and comedian in Ghaziabad.

References

Social groups of India
Social groups of Pakistan
Punjabi tribes